Moneim is a given name and surname. Notable people with the name include:

Abdel Moneim El-Guindi, Egyptian boxer
Abdel Moneim Madbouly (1921–2006), Egyptian actor, comedian, and playwright
Abdel Moneim Wahby (1911–1988), Egyptian basketball player, referee, and administrator
Alaa El-Din Abdul Moneim (born 1951), current "independent member" of the Egyptian Parliament
Prince Muhammad Abdul Moneim Beyefendi (1899–1979), Egyptian prince and former heir apparent to the throne of Egypt and Sudan

Arabic-language surnames
Arabic masculine given names